Agias Sofias Square  is a square in the city of Thessaloniki in Greece.

History
The square dates back to the Byzantine period of the city and took its name from the church of Hagia Sophia (Holy Wisdom) located within it. At the time it was also called Skalia. During a fire in 1890, it was heavily damaged but was restored under the supervision of Charles Diehl, a notable Byzantinist.

Although not a square today, plans have been released which include the complete redevelopment of the area with a new square and pedestrianized zone to extent from the Church of the Acheiropoietos to the sea.

Gallery

Sources
 Agias Sofias Square

Roman Thessalonica
Byzantine architecture in Thessaloniki
Buildings and structures in Thessaloniki
Squares in Thessaloniki
Byzantine Revival architecture in Greece